Social movement unionism (SMU) is a trend of theory and practice in contemporary trade unionism.  Strongly associated with the labour movements of developing countries, social movement unionism is distinct from many other models of trade unionism because it concerns itself with more than organizing workers around workplace issues, pay and terms and conditions. It engages in wider political struggles for human rights, social justice and democracy. Social movement unionism grew out of political struggles in developing countries and was theorized as a distinct industrial relations model in the late 1980s and early 1990s.

In this model, trade unions are not distinct from social movements and form part of a wider ecosystem of political activism that includes faith groups, civic and residents' organizations and student groups. These are usually organized into democratic umbrella organizations along a popular front model. The umbrella organization generally has a programme or manifesto that all affiliates commit themselves to.

A prime example of social movement unionism is the link between the trade union federation Cosatu and the wider anti-apartheid struggle through the United Democratic Front in South Africa in the 1980s. More recently, Cosatu has successfully campaigned with the Treatment Action Campaign for access to medication for HIV/AIDS. Social movement unionism is also a feature of the industrial relations of Brazil and the Philippines.

SMU is widely considered  to be a highly dynamic and successful model, as evidenced by the success against apartheid and for treatment access, and by the fact that countries practising this model have generally reversed the trend of trade union decline experienced in the developed world. For instance, union density grew in South Africa by 130% between 1985 and 1995, during a period of steep decline in many developed countries.
 
In the developed world, SMU is strongly associated with the organizing model of trade unionism, and overlaps with community unionism.  SMU attempts to integrate workers, trade unions and the labour movement into broader coalitions for social and economic justice. Thus, in principle, unions and other organizations support each other in what are seen as mutually beneficial goals.

The campus living wage work of unions, which have frequently worked with chapters of United Students Against Sweatshops, are an example of the principle in practice.  Similarly, the 'Teamsters for Turtles' (as their T-shirts had it) at Seattle signalled a willingness of sections of the labour movement to engage with environmental concerns.

Other prominent examples include the relationship between Reclaim the Streets and the Liverpool Dockers (UK) during their strike in the late 1990s; and the relationship between the Coalition of Immokalee Workers and progressive US students during the Boot the Bell campaign. Various labour–environmental coalitions also fit this social movement model.

Union initiatives 

Union support for social justice causes can come from  within the scope of their respective collective agreements. Unions are increasingly demanding that new collective agreements contain clauses that are intended to further social justice. The inclusion of social justice support in a negotiated contract, compels all parties to support these causes in a legally binding way.

This may extend to funding the education of rank and file union members in various social justice issues (i.e. fair trade policies, anti-poverty initiatives, anti-globalization campaigns and race, gender and human rights issues, etc.) and financial or technical support for non-union causes. Generally speaking, social movement unionism advocates greater levels of democracy and equality for all people, regardless of union membership.

Collective bargaining

During contract negotiations or collective bargaining, some unions are pushing for the inclusion of various social justice clauses to be added to the collective agreement. One example of this may be a demand that a percentage of future wages be transferred to a fund to be used to effect social justice issues nationally or internationally on behalf of the union membership. Another example is a recent trend of demanding a portion of hourly wages to be deferred to a paid education leave (PEL) fund, to allow union members to leave the work place for a period of time, at no loss of pay, so they can attend social justice seminars and educational programs. These demands are forwarded as proposals to the employer during collective bargaining negotiations.

See also

 Broad left
 Red–green alliance

References

Further reading
 Report of a 2001 Jobs With Justice Conference entitled Building Social Movement Unionism, indicating the assumptions which lie behind the term and revealing some practical strategies.
 Social Movement Unionism and Progressive Public Policy in New York City, a paper by Jeremy Reiss.
 Chapter on Social Movement Unionism  in the booklet Fighting Back with Social Movement Unionism: A Handbook for APL Activists,  produced by the Alliance of Progressive Labour in the Philippines.
 This brief article gives some idea of how the term in question is so connected and conflated with the organizing model, and the realization of the need for (another) 'new unionism'.
 Labor Notes magazine
 organizing.work Union movement strategy blog

Trade unions
Labor relations